BB1 may refer to:

BB1, a postcode district in the BB postcode area
USS Indiana (BB-1), a United States battleship which served from 1895 until 1919
Budd BB-1 Pioneer, an experimental flying boat produced by the Budd Company in the 1930s
Peugeot BB1, an electric concept car introduced at Frankfurt Motor Show in 2009
Big Brother 1, a television programme in various versions
BB-1, the prototype name of the Soviet World War II light bomber, the Sukhoi Su-2
 Neuromedin B receptor or BB1, a bombesin receptor, previously known as Neuromedin B receptor (NMBR)
Baahubali: The Beginning, an Indian film directed by S.S. Rajamouli

BB1 - brand of leather handbags & belts